There have been two baronetcies created for persons with the surname Gould, one in the Baronetage of England and one in the Baronetage of Great Britain.

The Gould Baronetcy, of the City of London, was created in the Baronetage of England on 13 June 1660 for Nicholas Gould, Member of Parliament for Fowey. The title became extinct on his death in 1664.

The Gould, later Morgan Baronetcy, of Tredegar in the County of Monmouth, was created in the Baronetage of Great Britain on 15 November 1792. For more information on this creation, see Baron Tredegar.

Gould baronets, of the City of London (1660)
Sir Nicholas Gould, 1st Baronet (died 1664)

Gould, later Morgan baronets, of Tredegar (1792)
see Baron Tredegar

References

Extinct baronetcies in the Baronetage of England
Extinct baronetcies in the Baronetage of Great Britain
1660 establishments in England